Gobioclinus kalisherae, the downy blenny, is a species of labrisomid blenny native to the western Atlantic Ocean from south Florida to Brazil.  This species prefers habitats which provide crevices or holes to hide in such as areas of rubble or rock and coral reefs.  It can reach a length of  TL.  It can also be found in the aquarium trade. The specific name honours the painter Emilia Kalisher (1868-1959), at the request of her future husband Joseph Cheesman Thompson (1874-1943).

References

kalisherae
Fish of the Western Atlantic
Fish described in 1904
Taxa named by David Starr Jordan